Turkey City is an unincorporated community in Clarion County, Pennsylvania,  United States.

History
The Turkey City post office was established in 1880. Turkey City has been noted for its colorful place name.

References

Unincorporated communities in Clarion County, Pennsylvania
Unincorporated communities in Pennsylvania